Khachatur Abovyan Park ( Khachatur Abovyani Purak),  is a park located in the Kentron district of Yerevan, Armenia, at the north of Abovyan Street. It forms the starting point of the Abovyan Street. The Yerevan State Medical University is located at the southern edge of the park.

The park is named after the noted Armenian writer of the 19th century, Khachatur Abovian.

It has a round-shaped garden centered with the statue of Khachatur Abovyan. The park was opened in 1950.

In 2018, the Hrant Matevosyan Cultural Center and Museum was built within the park.

References

Parks in Yerevan
Tourist attractions in Yerevan
Geography of Yerevan